Below is a list of awards, accolades, and recognitions that Smithsonian Folkways and its collection of labels have won throughout their existence.

Grammy Awards

Latin Grammy Awards

Grammy Lifetime Achievement Awards

References

Smithsonian Folkways